Aemene pseudonigra is a moth of the family Erebidae. It was described by Jeremy Daniel Holloway in 2001. It is found on Borneo. The habitat consists of upper montane forests.

The length of the forewings is 9 mm for males and 8–9 mm for females.

References

Cisthenina
Moths described in 2001
Moths of Asia